Bertarelli is an Italian surname. Notable people with the surname include:

Camillo Bertarelli (1886–1982), Italian cyclist
Dona Bertarelli (born 1968), Swiss businesswoman and billionaire
Ernesto Bertarelli (born 1965), Italian-born Swiss businessman, billionaire and philanthropist
Kirsty Bertarelli (born 1971), British billionaire

Italian-language surnames